Ram Stadium is a 5,000-seat stadium in Shepherdstown, West Virginia. It is home to the Shepherd University Rams football and lacrosse teams.

The stadium was built in 1959 and renovated several times, most recently in 2000.

References 

College football venues
College lacrosse venues in the United States
Shepherd Rams football
American football venues in West Virginia
Lacrosse venues in the United States
Soccer venues in West Virginia
Buildings and structures in Jefferson County, West Virginia
Tourist attractions in Jefferson County, West Virginia
Sports venues completed in 2000
2000 establishments in West Virginia